Gazestan (also Romanized as Gazestān) is a village in Zarrin Rural District, Kharanaq District, Ardakan County, Yazd Province, Iran. At the 2006 census, its population was 17, in 9 families.

References 

Populated places in Ardakan County